John Norman Stuart Buchan, 2nd Baron Tweedsmuir CBE, CD, FRSE, FRSA (25 November 1911 – 20 June 1996), commonly called Johnnie Buchan, was a British peer and  the son of the novelist John Buchan, 1st Baron Tweedsmuir. He was a colonial administrator, naturalist, and adventurer. He has been described as a "brilliant fisherman and naturalist, a gallant soldier and fine writer of English, an explorer, colonial administrator and man of business."

Early life
Buchan was born in London the son of Baron Tweedsmuir and Susan Grosvenor.

He was educated at Eton and in 1930 he went to Brasenose College, Oxford, where he graduated with a fourth class degree in History. While at Brasenose College he was an active member of the Brasenose College Boat Club, and rowed in the College's 1st Torpid.  As an undergraduate, he was also a close friend of John Gorton.

Buchan subsequently went on to study at the Dundee School of Economics.

Military career
After a period in the Colonial Administrative Service in Uganda he contracted dysentery and was forced to leave Africa on health grounds. He went to join his parents in Canada in 1936. Here he joined the Hudson's Bay Company. He drove a dog-sled 3000 miles and spent the winter of 1938/9 at the remote Cape Dorset in Baffinland.

In September 1939 at the onset of war, he joined the Governor General's Foot Guards in Canada, and was with the first Canadian troopship to reach England in December 1939. In February 1940 his father died and he became Baron Tweedsmuir. In 1941 he saw active service with the Hastings and Prince Edward Regiment (with whom he started as second in command), ultimately in Sicily for which he was appointed an Officer of the Order of the British Empire (OBE) in the 1946 New Year Honours.

Farley Mowat, who served as an infantryman in the HPE Regiment, described Tweedsmuir, newly in command (due to his predecessor, Bruce Sutcliff, having been killed).  Mowat's account is in his war memoir, "And No Birds Sang" (1975, 2003).  The task was to take Assoro, an ancient, and well-fortified, promontory blocking the regiment's advance.

"Barely thirty years of age, soft-spoken, kindly, with a slight tendency to stutter, he was a tall fair-haired English romantic out of another age . . . his famous father's perhaps.  'Tweedie,' as we called him behind his back, had as a youth sought high adventure [in the Arctic, the African veldt, Canada].  But until this hour real adventure in the grand tradition had eluded him.

Going forward on his own reconnaissance that afternoon in company with the new second-in-command, Major 'Ack Ack' Kennedy, Tweedsmuir looked up at the towering colossus of Assoro with the visionary eye of a Lawrence of Arabia, and saw that the only way to accomplish the impossible was to attempt the impossible.  He thereupon decided that the battalion would make a right flank march by night across the intervening trackless gullies to the foot of the great cliff, scale that precipitous wall and, just at dawn, take the summit by surprise."

The operation succeeded. Tweedsmuir was later wounded in Sicily. He was twice Mentioned in Dispatches.

Scientific career
He led scientific expeditions to Libya and St Ninians Island and was 21 years President of the British Schools Exploring Society. He was promoted to be a Commander of the Order of the British Empire (CBE) in 1964.

Later life
In later life he lived in Kingston House at Kingston Bagpuize in rural Oxfordshire.

He returned to Scotland for the final two months of his life and died in a small cottage in North Berwick.

He had no male heir, so upon his death the barony passed to his younger brother.

Family
He married Priscilla Grant, widow of Sir Arthur Grant of Monymusk. She died of cancer in 1978. He remarried in 1980 to Lady Jean Grant.

With Priscilla, who sat in the House of Lords suo jure as The Baroness Tweedsmuir of Belhelvie, they jointly created the Protection of Birds Act 1954.

Publications
Always a Countryman (1953)
One Man's Happiness (1968)

Positions held
Rector of Aberdeen University 1948-51
Chairman of the Joint East and Central African Board 1950-52
President of the Institute of Rural Life 1951-85
President of the Federation of Commonwealth and British Empire Chambers of Commerce 1955-7
President of the Institute of Export 1964-7
Company Director of BOAC.
Company Director of Dalgety plc
Company Director of Sun Alliance
Chairman of the Advertising Standards Authority (United Kingdom) 1971-4
Chairman of the Council on Tribunals 1973-80

References

External links

Barons in the Peerage of the United Kingdom
People educated at Eton College
Buchan, John Norman Stuart
Alumni of the University of Dundee
Rectors of the University of Aberdeen
1911 births
1996 deaths
Hastings and Prince Edward Regiment officers
Spouses of life peers
Canadian Army personnel of World War II
Military personnel from London